The University of Oklahoma Press (OU Press) is the publishing arm of the University of Oklahoma. Founded in 1929 by the fifth president of the University of Oklahoma, William Bennett Bizzell, it was the first university press to be established in the American Southwest. The OU Press is one of the leading presses in the region, and is primarily known for its titles on the American West and Native Americans, though the press publishes texts on other subjects as well, ranging from wildlife to ancient languages. Tornadoes and severe weather are another focus. The press releases around 80 books every year. A profile of the University of Oklahoma Press from 2018 quotes OU President David Boren as saying: "The OU Press is one of the crown jewels of the University of Oklahoma.”

Domestic distribution for the press is currently provided by the University of North Carolina Press's Longleaf Services.

The Arthur H. Clark Company (founded 1902) was a major printer of publications related to the history of the Western United States. In July 2006, the company was acquired by the University of Oklahoma Press and relocated to Norman, Oklahoma, where it continues as an imprint.

See also

 List of English-language book publishing companies
 List of university presses

Notes

Native American literature
Press
Oklahoma, University of
Book publishing companies based in Oklahoma